The Billboard Most-Played Folk Records of 1946 is a year-end chart compiled Billboard magazine ranking the year's top folk records based on the number of times the record was played on the nation's juke boxes. In 1946, country music records were included on, and dominated, the Billboard folk records chart.

Gene Autry, Al Dexter, and Bob Wills led the way with four records each on the year-end list. Merle Travis and Ernest Tubb followed with three apiece.

The song "Sioux City Sue" was included on the list three times, with records by Zeke Manners, the Hoosier Hot Shots, and Dick Thomas. In addition, Bing Crosby had a version that ranked No. 34 on the year-end pop chart.

Columbia led all labels with 16 records on the year-end chart. Capitol, Victor, and Decca followed with five records each.

See also
Billboard year-end top pop singles of 1946
Billboard Most-Played Race Records of 1946
1946 in country music

Notes

References

1946 record charts
Billboard charts